The 1979 CFU Championship was the second edition of the CFU Championship, the football championship being held in the Caribbean. It was in Suriname between the 11–18 November 1979 and saw Haiti taking out the title after winning all three of their final round games.

Qualifying tournament

First round
The following are known result only; there may be more matches (given that Saint Vincent and the Grenadines appeared in the second round but not in the first round).

Second round

Haiti qualified for the finals

Saint Vincent and the Grenadines qualified for the finals

 Trinidad and Tobago also qualified for the finals; it is unknown whether it beat an opponent or received a bye.

Final tournament

The final stage was held in Paramaribo, Suriname.

References

RSSSF archives

Caribbean Cup
1979 in association football
1979 in Suriname